Higher Futures, established in 2006, is the Lifelong Learning Network (LLN) for South Yorkshire, North Derbyshire and North Nottinghamshire. It is one of many LLNs operating in each region across the country.

Higher Futures aims to help vocational and work-based learners in five priority sectors - early years education, engineering, health and social care, public wellbeing, and sustainable communities - to progress from further education to higher education.

Higher Futures' partner institutions are:

 Sheffield Hallam University (lead partner)
 University of Sheffield
 Barnsley College
 Chesterfield College
 Dearne Valley College
 Doncaster College
 Longley Park Sixth Form
 North Nottinghamshire College
 Northern College
 Rotherham College of Arts and Technology
 The Sheffield College
 Thomas Rotherham College

Aims and objectives
Through effective collaboration, Higher Futures aims to:

 Enhance the supply of higher education provision and transform institutional cultures, processes and procedures;
 Improve progression opportunities to higher education through vocational routes;
 Increase demand from employers and vocational learners for higher level skills and education;
 Improve access to information, advice and guidance (IAG) and transition support.

See also 

 Lifelong Learning Networks (LLNs)

External links 
 Higher Futures

Education in England
Sheffield Hallam University
Vocational education in the United Kingdom